The Metropolitan Cathedral Church of the Holy Cross, Our Lady of Regla, and St Francis of Assisi is the main ecclesiastical building of the Catholic Church in Chihuahua City, Chihuahua, Mexico.  It is considered perhaps the finest example of colonial architecture in northern Mexico and it was built between 1725 and 1792. The cathedral is also the seat of the Roman Catholic Archdiocese of Chihuahua.  the archbishop was Constancio Miranda Weckmann.

Style and architecture
The building is situated on the Plaza de Armas. It is designed in the Spanish Baroque style, and is in the form of a latin cross, with a dome above the crossing.

The façade is  interesting in that it involves the use of solomonic columns which were not widely used in New Spain at the time.  It has an octagonal window that was shipped from Germany and is considered a fine specimen of the glassmakers art. In addition, the front contains a collection of monuments celebrating the twelve apostles, with a clock above, crowned with the sculpture of an angel that was added in the 19th century.  The royal Spanish coat of arms occupied the area below the angel, but was removed by architect José Félix Maceira in 1874 and the clock, which was acquired in London, was added, giving the façade its present appearance.

The nave is divided from the ambulatories by arches which support the massive ceiling, and has a fine baptistry chapel on the right, or north side, just inside from the narthex.  Directly opposite, on the south side, inside the Chapel of Christ of Mapimí, is the tomb of St Peter of Jesus Maldonado, a priest and martyr who was ordained in the Cathedral Parish of Saint Patrick in El Paso, Texas, and canonised by Pope John Paul II in 2000. The chapel is decorated with an 18th-century retablo, or reredos containing a venerated image of Christ, in which Primitive and Baroque elements are mingled.  The chancel contains an unusual double altar, in which a smaller altar of Carrara marble was incorporated into the existing larger one of local quarry stone, after the church was built.  The organ in the east gallery was built in 1885 by Hook and Hastings, Op. 1244 (2 manuals, 18 registers), and rebuilt and expanded by E F Walcker & Cie. in 1960.  The Hook and Hastings instrument had, in turn, replaced a George Jardine organ that was built in 1837, and rebuilt by Jardine in 1869.

The Blessed Sacrament Chapel, of baroque and rococo design, is reached by a door in the south side of the nave. The sculpture above the entrance depicts Our Lady of Regla and her supplicants, Ss Francis of Assisi and Rita of Cascia, the patrons of the city, above the Hebrews Shadrach, Meshach and Abednego in the fiery furnace (see illustration below).  The Sacred Art Museum is located in the crypt, adjacent to the tombs of the past prelates of the archdiocese. It displays a collection of paintings by such known Colonial-era artists as Miguel Cabrera, José de Alcíbar, José de Páez and Antonio de Torres; portraits of Pope John Paul II and the prelates of Chihuahua are represented as well.  The throne that the Pope used during his 1990 Mass in Chihuahua and the large and ornate former archbishops cathedra and canopy are on display, as are contemporary paintings of the cathedral and several life-sized statues of the saints, some of which are two centuries old.

History

Originally, Sergeant-Major Don Juan Antonio Trasviña y Retes, one of the leading Spanish citizens of the village, donated the land for the first church in the villa, where the cathedral would later stand.

The first stone was placed on 21 June 1725 by the Bishop of Nueva Vizcaya in Durango, Don Benito Crespo y Monroy (in those times, Chihuahua depended religiously upon, and was a part of, the Diocese of Durango.)  The church was paid for with local commercial donations and by mine owners in the city and in Santa Eulalia, a pueblo to the east, and also by a tax of one real on each mark of silver that was mined in the province.

The first superintendent of construction was Pedro Coronado, followed by Miguel de la Sierra and then Master Architect José de la Cruz, who finalised the plans, and was buried in the church upon his death in 1734.  Others followed until Architect Bernardo del Carpio began the construction of the towers in 1758.  The bells had been cast in 1730, and were placed in the newly completed towers in 1780, directed by Superintendent Melchor Guaspe.

Construction of the church was completed in 1792. The building was slightly damaged during the French intervention in Mexico, repaired, and was designated a cathedral on 23 June 1891, with the erection of the Chihuahua diocese from the Diocese of Durango.  At that time, the new diocese was responsible for the faithful throughout the entire state.  Chihuahua was elevated to the status of an archdiocese on 22 November 1958 and now is the metropolitan archdiocese for five suffragan dioceses in the state of Chihuahua.

In 1910, with the commemoration of the century of the Independence of Mexico, the cathedral was decorated with lights. It was not until 2005 when the cathedral was illuminated again, this time permanently. In October 2008 celebrating the upcoming tricentenary of the city of Chihuahua, a lights display show took place at the cathedral.

Other photographs

Notes

External links
 Official Cathedral of Chihuahua website (Spanish)
 Gob.mx: Cathedral of Chihuahua (Spanish)
 Archdiocese of Chihuahua website (Spanish)
 Organsociety.org: Chihuahua Cathedral's pipe organ

Chihuahua City
Buildings and structures in Chihuahua (state)
Roman Catholic cathedrals in Mexico
Museums in Chihuahua (state)
Art museums and galleries in Mexico
Religious museums in Mexico
Roman Catholic churches completed in 1792
Landmarks in Chihuahua (state)
National Monuments of Mexico
1725 establishments in New Spain
1720s establishments in Mexico
Tourist attractions in Chihuahua (state)
Spanish Colonial architecture in Mexico
Baroque church buildings in Mexico
Church buildings with domes
18th-century Roman Catholic church buildings in Mexico

it:Arcidiocesi di Chihuahua